Tate Buckley Donovan (born September 25, 1963) is an American actor, comedian and television director. He is known for portraying Tom Shayes in Damages, Jimmy Cooper in The O.C., and the voice of the title character in the 1997 Disney animated film Hercules, the animated television series of the same name and in a few Kingdom Hearts video games. He starred opposite Sandra Bullock in the 1992 film, Love Potion No. 9.

He also had supporting roles in films, such as Good Night, and Good Luck and Argo. Donovan also played Brian Sanders in Hostages and White House Chief of Staff Mark Boudreau in 24: Live Another Day. He has been a guest star in a number of television series, notably Friends. He was nominated for the Independent Spirit Award for Best Supporting Male for his performance in the film Inside Monkey Zetterland.

He has also worked as a producer of 30 for 30 Shorts, for which he won a Primetime Emmy Award for Outstanding Short Form Nonfiction or Reality Series.

Early life
Donovan was born on September 25, 1963, in Tenafly, New Jersey, to John Timothy Donovan, a surgeon, and Eileen Frances (née McAllister), both Roman Catholics of Irish descent. Donovan is the youngest of six children. He attended Dwight-Englewood School in Englewood, New Jersey, before transferring to Tenafly High School and attending the University of Southern California. He has appeared on television since his teenage years.

Career

Film
Donovan's earliest film roles included Kevin Donaldson in SpaceCamp (1986), a recovering drug addict in Clean and Sober (1988), 1st Lieutenant Luke Sinclair in Memphis Belle (1990) and Paul Matthews in Love Potion No. 9 (1992).  Donovan voiced the title character in the Disney animated film Hercules (1997).  Donovan played Jesse Zousmer in the Best Picture nominated film Good Night, and Good Luck (2005).  In 2007, Donovan starred in the film Nancy Drew alongside Emma Roberts.  Later, he played Bob Anders, one of the key supporting roles in the Oscar-winning film Argo (2012). In 2019, Donovan portrayed the role of Doug Weston in Rocketman.

Television
Donovan portrayed Joshua, the love interest of Rachel Green, for several episodes of Season 4 of Friends. Ironically, he had recently broken up with Jennifer Aniston in real life. He also portrayed 'Cheanie' in 1997, who was a client of and also dated Ally McBeal in season 1 of the show. He later portrayed the priest-son of a large Catholic family in Trinity (1998). He has appeared as a guest star in several television series, such as Magnum, P.I. (1986), The Guardian (2001), Mister Sterling (2003), Exposed (2003), and The O.C. (2003), where he appeared as Jimmy Cooper. From 2007 to 2010, he portrayed Tom Shayes on Damages. In 2005, Donovan began directing episodic television when he directed an episode of The O.C.. In 2007 he guest starred on a season 6 episode of Law & Order: Criminal Intent. In 2009, he directed an episode of the sixth season of Medium. He also directed two episodes of Damages in its third season and an episode of Nip/Tuck in its sixth season. In 2010, Donovan directed the third episode in the sixth season of Weeds, the tenth episode in the fourth season of Gossip Girl, the fourth episode of the fifth season, and one episode of Damages from the third season. In 2011, Donovan directed the Valentine's Day-themed episode of Glee and the episode "I Kissed a Girl" in the third season. In March 2010, he joined the cast of No Ordinary Family. However, after only one season, the series was cancelled. Donovan guest appeared in the series, Red Oaks. Starting in 2017, Donovan appeared in CBS’s MacGyver as James MacGyver, father to the main character.

Stage
Donovan starred on stage with Amy Ryan in the Los Angeles production of Rabbit Hole. On Broadway, he played Alan Seymour in the 1994 Roundabout Theatre Company revival of Picnic and appeared in Amy's View with Judi Dench in 1999. Off Broadway, Donovan appeared with Glenn Fitzgerald in the 2001 production of Lobby Hero by Kenneth Lonergan, playing the role of the crooked cop Bill. Donovan has appeared in numerous productions at the Williamstown Theater Festival, including Once in a Lifetime, Under the Blue Sky, and The Glass Menagerie. He has also appeared at the Irish Repertory Theater in New York City. In 2011, he starred with Frances McDormand in the world premiere of David Lindsay-Abaire's play Good People at the Manhattan Theatre Club.

Other work
Donovan had a regular gig with traditional Irish band the McGuffins, with whom he released an album titled Wake Amusements. He plays the bodhrán and fiddle.

As of May 2011, Donovan voices radio and video advertising for PNC Financial Services and volunteers with the Young Storytellers Program.

Personal life
Donovan was in a relationship with Sandra Bullock from 1990 to 1994, and Jennifer Aniston for two and a half years from 1995 to 1998. He later married writer Corinne Kingsbury on a Malibu, California beach in 2005. They divorced in 2008.

In 2008, Donovan announced his support and campaigned for Barack Obama in the U.S. presidential election of 2008. Donovan also supported Obama in the 2012 presidential election.

Filmography

Film

Television

References

External links
 
 Tate Donovan Discusses "Damages"

1963 births
Living people
20th-century American male actors
21st-century American male actors
American male film actors
American male television actors
American male video game actors
American male voice actors
American people of Irish descent
American television directors
Audiobook narrators
Bodhrán players
Catholics from New Jersey
Dwight-Englewood School alumni
Male actors from New Jersey
Outstanding Performance by a Cast in a Motion Picture Screen Actors Guild Award winners
People from Tenafly, New Jersey
Tenafly High School alumni
USC School of Dramatic Arts alumni